is a Japanese voice actor affiliated with Arts Vision. He is best known for voicing the character Izuku Midoriya in the popular shonen anime My Hero Academia. He won the Best Male Newcomer award at the 8th Seiyu Awards.

Filmography

Anime series

Original video animation (OVA)
Yowamushi Pedal (2013), Sakamichi Onoda
Blue Spring Ride (2014), Naitō
My Hero Academia: Save! Rescue Training (2016), Izuku Midoriya
My Hero Academia: Training of the Dead (2017), Izuku Midoriya
Oresuki: Oretachi no Game Set (2020), Amatsuyu "Jouro" Kisaragi

Special
Oresuki: Ore wa Teinei ni Susumeru (2019), Amatsuyu "Jouro" Kisaragi

Anime films
Tamako Love Story (2014), Inuyama
Yowamushi Pedal Re:Ride (2014), Sakamichi Onoda
The Empire of Corpses (2015), Nikolai Krasotkin
Yowamushi Pedal Re: ROAD (2015), Sakamichi Onoda
Yowamushi Pedal: The Movie (2015), Sakamichi Onoda
Doraemon the Movie: Nobita's Treasure Island (2018), Flock
My Hero Academia: Two Heroes (2018), Izuku Midoriya
My Hero Academia: Heroes Rising (2019), Izuku Midoriya
My Hero Academia: World Heroes' Mission (2021), Izuku Midoriya
Ensemble Stars!! Road to Show!! (2022), Ritsu Sakuma
Backflip!! (2022), Shunsuke Azuma
Drifting Home (2022), Yuzuru Tachibana

Video games
Akiba's Trip: Undead & Undressed (2013), Kaito Tachibana
Gaist Crusher (2013), Rekka Shirogane
Age 12 (2014)
Gaist Crusher God (2014), Rekka Shirogane
Oreshika: Tainted Bloodlines (2014)
Senjō no Waltz (2014), Richard
Yome Collection (2014), Sakamichi Onoda
Granblue Fantasy (2014), Young Cat
Dragalia Lost (2018), Ricardt, Delphi
Tokyo Xanadu (2015), Yuuki Shinomiya
Yowamushi Pedal High Cadence to Tomorrow (2015), Sakamichi Onoda
Ensemble Stars! (2015), Ritsu Sakuma
Touken Ranbu (2015), Imanotsurugi, Atsushi Toushirou
The Idolm@ster: SideM (2016), Kirio Nekoyanagi
 The Cinderella Contract (2014—present), Prince Cyril Evan Ingrays (Cyril)
Tsuki no Paradise (2016–present), Sakuraba Ryouta
My Hero: One's Justice (2018), Izuku Midoriya
Food Fantasy (2018) – Escargot, Tom Yum, Omurice
Jump Force (2019) - Izuku Midoriya
Wizard's Symphony (2019), Volk Dartfang
Astral Chain (2019) - Harold "Hal" Clark
Hero's Park (2019), Domyo Keito
Namu Amida Butsu! -UTENA- (2019), Karuraten
Pokémon Masters (2019), Hau
Grand Chase: Dimensional Chaser - Veigas TerreMy Hero: One's Justice 2 (2020) - Izuku MidoriyaFate Grand Order (2020) - Oda NobukatsuJoJo's Bizarre Adventure: Last Survivor (2020) - Narancia GhirgaTale of Food (2020) - ZǐtuīyànJoJo's Bizarre Adventure: All Star Battle R (2022), Narancia Ghirga

Japanese dubbing
Live-action

Animation

OtherAsa Dayo! Kai Shain'' - Unio douglasiae

References

External links
 Official agency profile 
 

1989 births
Living people
Arts Vision voice actors
Japanese male video game actors
Japanese male voice actors
Male voice actors from Shizuoka Prefecture
Seiyu Award winners
21st-century Japanese male actors